Cherwell may refer to:

Geography 

Cherwell, Queensland, a locality in the Fraser Coast Region, Australia
Cherwell District, an administrative district in Oxfordshire, England
River Cherwell, in Northamptonshire and Oxfordshire, England

People 

 Lord Cherwell (1886–1957), adviser to the British government

Other uses 

Cherwell School, secondary school in Oxford, England
Cherwell Software, American technology company and software vendor
Cherwell (newspaper), Oxford University, England
HMS Cherwell, destroyer in the Royal Navy, 1903